Val Joe Walker (January 7, 1930 –December 25, 2013) was a defensive back in the National Football League. He was drafted in the seventh round of the 1952 NFL Draft by the New York Giants and would later play four seasons with the Green Bay Packers and one with the San Francisco 49ers.

References

Players of American football from Texas
Green Bay Packers players
San Francisco 49ers players
American football defensive backs
SMU Mustangs football players
1930 births
2013 deaths
Lamar High School (Arlington, Texas) alumni
People from Tahoka, Texas